Mercy Tiffin Hospital is a hospital in Tiffin, Ohio and is part of Catholic Health Partners.

References

External links
http://www.mercyweb.org

Hospitals in Ohio